Morgan Park may refer to:

 Morgan Park, Baltimore
 Morgan Park, Chicago
 Morgan Park, Duluth, Minnesota
 Morgan Park, Queensland, a locality in the Southern Downs Region, Australia